Madeleine Boullogne (baptised 24 July 1646, Paris - 30 January 1710, Paris) was a French Baroque still life painter.

Biography
Boullogne was the daughter of Louis Boullogne, a painter and one of the founders of the Académie royale de peinture et de sculpture, and the sister of the painters Bon, Louis and Geneviève Boullogne. On 7 November 1669 she was received into the Académie royale de peinture et de sculpture. She began working in the royal workshops, notably at the Palais des Tuileries, where she painted four canvases for the antechamber to the Grand appartement du roi, but also at the Versailles, where she painted for the antechamber of the Grand appartement de la reine.

Madeleine Boullogne lived an austere and pious life, teaching many students, remaining unmarried and living with her brother Bon. Marked by a strict Augustinism bordering on Jansenism, she lived a semi-monastic life. Her presence in the Nécrologe de Port-Royal  well shows this lifestyle :

She painted many works on life at Port-Royal-des-Champs, that Louise-Magdeleine Horthemels then engraved and which were extremely popular. She also painted still lifes and many portraits, as well as many religious paintings.

Madeleigne Boullogne was forgotten little by little over the 18th century, with some of her paintings even being attributed to others. She is best known for her paintings on Port-Royal, especially since many of her paintings at the Tuileries have disappeared and most of her work at Versailles was destroyed in the construction of the Galerie des Glaces.

Works 
 Salon of 1673 : six paintings of trophies and one still life of fruits
 Salon of 1704 : one still life of fruits, one still life of musical instruments
 Versailles, château, above the door to the antechamber of the Grand Couvert, 1673.

Notes and sources

 Caix de Saint-Aymour, Une famille d’artistes et de financiers : les Boullongne, Paris, Henri Laurens, 1919.
 Notice sur le site de la Société Internationale pour l’Étude des Femmes de l’Ancien Régime (SIEFAR) online text
 Dictionnaire de Port-Royal, sous la direction de Jean Lesaulnier et Anthony McKenna, Paris, Honoré Champion, 2004.
 Michel Faré, Le Grand Siècle de la nature morte, le XVIIe siècle, Paris, Fribourg, 1974, p. 245-9.

External links 

 Madeleine de Boullongne dans la base joconde

1646 births
1710 deaths
17th-century French painters
18th-century French painters
18th-century French women artists
17th-century French women artists
French Baroque painters
Painters from Paris